"U.S.S.R." is the debut single by the English singer Eddy Huntington, released in 1986.

The song reached number 23 in Germany and number 6 in Switzerland.

The song would later appear on Huntington's only studio album, Bang Bang Baby, released by ZYX Records in 1989.

Track listing and formats 

 Italian 7-inch single

A. "U.S.S.R." – 3:24
B. "You (Excess) Are" – 3:43

 Italian 12-inch maxi-single

A. "U.S.S.R." – 5:53
B. "You (Excess) Are" – 5:20

Credits and personnel 

 Eddy Huntington – vocals
 Tom Hooker – songwriter
 Michele Chieregato – songwriter, producer
 Roberto Turatti – songwriter, producer
 Cedric Beatty – engineering

Credits and personnel adopted from the Bang Bang Baby album and 7-inch single liner notes.

Charts

References

External links 

 

1986 songs
1986 debut singles
Eddy Huntington songs
ZYX Music singles
Songs written by Tom Hooker